Miguel Ángel Berchelt Cervera (born 17 November 1991) is a Mexican professional boxer who held the WBC super featherweight title from 2017 to 2021.

Amateur career
Berchelt tried out at the age of 16 for the football club he supported as a child, Pumas UNAM. He turned to boxing after being rejected. During his amateur career, he was a three-time Mexican National Boxing Champion in the Elite category. Berchelt never represented his country internationally as Óscar Valdez was the highest-ranked boxer in the featherweight division at the time. The two never faced each other as amateurs.

Professional career

Early career
Berchelt turned pro at the age of 18, moving from his native Cancún to Mérida. He debuted on his 19th birthday, defeating Armin Chan by way of technical knockout in the 2nd round. Berchelt lived in a single room above a gym with six other boxers during this time.  He was considered the boxer of the year in 2011 by the World Boxing Council. He amassed a 15-0 record with 13 knockouts before getting his first chance to compete for a belt in September 2012. Berchelt defeated Berman Sánchez for the WBC Youth Intercontinental super featherweight by technical knockout after 2 rounds. Berchelt made his US debut in March 2013 beating Claudio Ríos by TKO in the first round in the undercard of Ríos-Alvarado II at the Mandalay Bay. Berchelt's career suffered a surprising setback when he was knocked out in just one round by Luis Eduardo Florez. Berchelt struggled getting inside the range of his taller opponent. He was knocked down by a left hook and struggled to beat the count before the referee waved the fight off.

However, Berchelt would get his career back on track by rattling off seven consecutive wins by way of knockout and winning the NABO super featherweight title. Berchelt first fought for a world title by facing George Jupp for the vacant interim WBO super featherweight. Berchelt won the title, defeating Jupp with a round 6 TKO in Mérida, his adopted hometown. Jupp was outmatched, having taken the fight at seven days' notice. Berchelt defended his title against Chonlatarn Piriyapinyo before vacating it to challenge WBC champion Francisco Vargas.

WBC super featherweight champion

Berchelt vs. Vargas 
On 2 December 2016 it was announced that Berchelt and Vargas would meet on 29 January 2017 at the Fantasy Springs Casino in Indio, California for the Vargas' WBC super featherweight title. Vargas and Berchelt traded punches in the early rounds, with cuts from Vargas' previous fights with Takashi Miura and Orlando Salido re-opening. On the latter rounds, Vargas started to slowly fade and Berchelt started to dominate the defending champion. The referee stopped the fight with 2:19 minutes elapsed in the round 11. According to CompuBox Stats, Vargas landed 330 of 1032 punches thrown (32%) and Berchelt landed 430 of his 947 thrown (45%). In the post fight interview, Berchelt said, "I wanted to fight the best of the best, and this fight happened because of that. Francisco is a great champion, he has fought the best and has been in two Fight of the Year contests. I knew what I was getting into I left my heart and soul on the mat. I am young and hungry. I want to thank Vargas for this incredible opportunity." Vargas stated he lost the fight due to cuts and would eventually want a rematch. The fight averaged 497,000 viewers and peaked at 561,000 viewers.

Initial defences 
Berchelt's first defense came on 15 July at The Forum in Inglewood, California against former WBC super featherweight champion Takashi Miura. Miura lost his title to Vargas in The Ring's 2015 Fight of the year. Miura had defeated Miguel Román in the Vargas vs. Berchelt undercard to become the WBC's mandatory challenger. Berchelt knocked down Miura in the first round and proceeded to out-point the former champion en route to a comfortable win by unanimous decision (120-109, 119-108, 116-111). This fight marked only the third time that a Berchelt bout went to the scorecards. Miura announced his retirement 2 weeks after this bout.

In October 2017, it was announced that Berchelt would close out the year by defending his title against Orlando Salido. On 14 October, Sean Gibbons, Salido's manager, told the LA Times that the fight had been finalized to take place on 9 December, meaning it would fall on the same day as Vasyl Lomachenko vs. Guillermo Rigondeaux. On 23 October, sources indicated that Berchelt was still having issues with his right hand and would not be able to fight. Berchelt was informed by the WBC that he would be allowed a voluntary defence before fighting the winner of Salido vs. Roman.

On 23 January 2018 a deal was finalized for Berchelt to defend his WBC title against 31 year old Philippine boxer Carlo Magali (29-9-3, 12 KOs) on 10 February in Cancún, Mexico. Berchelt had not fought in front of his home fans since July 2011. Originally, Cristian Mijares was scheduled to challenge Berchelt, however a deal could not be reached. A week before the fight, Magali was replaced by African boxer Maxwell Awuku (44-3-1, 30 KOs). Berchelt dropped Awuku twice, winning the bout via TKO in round 3. The referee stopped the bout with 14 seconds remaining in the round. The first knockdown occurred following a straight right and then the second knockdown, which followed after Awuku beat the count, was from a hard jab. The fight was then stopped with Awuku pinned against the ropes receiving power shots. The fight, which aired on TV Azteca in Mexico, was watched by 6 million viewers.

Berchelt vs. Barros 
A couple days after defeating Awuku, it was reported that Berchelt would next fight his mandatory challenger Miguel Román (59-12, 46 KOs) in May 2018. Roman's promoter Osvaldo Küchle was willing to go to purse bids. He revealed Zanfer Promotions made an offer, however it was not satisfactory. Küchle wanted to take the fight to a football stadium. On 19 March, Zanfer Promotions announced that Berchelt would make a voluntary defence in Mérida, before fighting Román later in the year. Argentine boxer and former featherweight world champion Jonathan Victor Barros (41-5-1, 22 KOs) became the front runner to challenge Berchelt on 23 June 2018. The deal was confirmed on 25 May for the fight to take place at the Poliforum Zamna with ESPN+ covering the fight in the United States. Barros was coming off a loss entering this bout following his failed world title challenge against then-IBF champion Lee Selby in July 2017 and at the time ranked #9 at featherweight by the WBC. n an easy title defense, Berchelt defeated Barros via TKO in round 3, successfully retaining his WBC title a third time. Berchelt dropped Barros in round 2 with a left hand to the head. Barros beat the count, however spent the remainder of the bout taking heavy shots. He was dropped again in round 3. Barros' trainer stepped up on the apron advising the referee to stop the bout. Despite Barros beating the count again and wanting to continue, the referee stopped the fight 1:53 of round 3. On the same night, mandatory challenger Miguel Román (60-12, 47 KOs) defeated then-undefeated Michel Marcano via stoppage in round 2. Prior to their respective bouts, the WBC ordered Berchelt vs. Roman to take place.

Berchelt vs. Román 
Whilst a deal was being finalized for the Berchelt-Román fight, it was said that HBO, who had showcased both boxers recent fights, would likely not broadcast the fight as there was interest from Showtime, ESPN+ and DAZN. On 24 August it was announced that ESPN+ had picked up the fight, to take place on 3 November 2018 in either Los Angeles or Texas. The Don Haskins Center in El Paso, Texas was later confirmed as the venue.

Berchelt vs. Vargas II 
Berchelt to face the former WBC super featherweight champion Francisco Vargas in his fifth title defense. Vargas was ranked #1 by the WBC at super featherweight. The bout was a rematch of their 28 January 2017 meeting, which Berchelt won by an eleventh-round knockout. The rematch was scheduled for 11 May 2019, for the undercard of the Emanuel Navarrete and Isaac Dogboe II WBO super bantamweight title bout. The card was broadcast by ESPN and took place at the Tucson Convention Center in Arizona. Berchelt justified his role as the betting favorite, as he won the fight by a sixth-round stoppage. He dominated the bout from the opening bell, with Vargas finding no success, which prompted his corner to retire their fighter at the end of the sixth round. Bercelt out-landed Vargas almost 2-to-1, landing 293 total punches to Vargas' 142.

Berchelt vs. Sosa 
Berchelt was booked to make his sixth title defense against the former WBA (Regular) super featherweight champion Jason Sosa. Sosa was ranked #4 by the WBC and #15 by the IBF at super featherweight. The title bout was scheduled as the main event of an ESPN broadcast card, which took place on 2 November 2019 at the Dignity Health Sports Park in Carson, California. Berchelt entered the fight as the favorite to retain the title, with most odds-makers having him at -5000, while Sosa entered the fight as a +1400 underdog. He won the fight by a fourth-round technical knockout, as Sosa's corner threw in the towel at the 2:56 minute mark. Berchelt out-landed the challenger 3-to-1 in total punches (122 to 43) and 4-to-1 in power punches landed (116 to 30).

Berchelt vs. Valdez 
On 25 September 2020, it was revealed that Berchelt would make his seventh title defense against the former WBO featherweight champion Óscar Valdez on 14 November 2020. Valdez was the mandatory challenger for Berchelt, as he had vacated the featherweight title in order to move up and challenge the reigning WBC super featherweight champion. Valdez was ranked #1 by the WBC and #2 by the WBO at super featherweight. The fight was postponed on 4 November, as Berchelt had tested positive for COVID-19. The bout was rescheduled for 20 February 2021. It headlined a DAZN broadcast card, which took place at the MGM Grand Conference Center in Paradise, Nevada. Despite coming into the fight as a favorite, Berchelt lost the fight by a tenth-round technical knockout. Valdez was leading on the scorecards at the time of the stoppage, with scores of 89–80, 88–81 and 87–82.

Move to lightweight

Berchelt vs. Nakathila
Following his loss to Valdez, Berchelt announced his intentions of moving up to lightweight. A month later, on 7 February, it was revealed that Berchelt would face the one-time WBO interim super featherweight title challenger Jeremiah Nakathila in his divisional debut. The bout headlined an ESPN card on 26 March 2022, thirteen months after his loss to Valdez. Berchelt retired from the fight at the end of the sixth round. He was knocked down with a jab in the third round and badly staggered near the end of the sixth round, after which his corner opted to withdraw their fighter from the contest. Berchelt landed less total punches (80 to 125) and power punches (27 to 78) than Nakathila, and was down 60–53 on all three of the judges' scorecards.

Professional boxing record

See also
List of world super-featherweight boxing champions
List of Mexican boxing world champions

References

External links

Miguel Berchelt - Profile, News Archive & Current Rankings at Box.Live

|-

1991 births
Living people
Mexican male boxers
Boxers from Quintana Roo
People from Cancún
Super-featherweight boxers
World super-featherweight boxing champions
World Boxing Council champions